The 2006 R+L Carriers New Orleans Bowl featured the Troy Trojans and the Rice Owls. Rice was making its first bowl appearance since the 1961 Bluebonnet Bowl.

Troy quarterback Omar Haugabook started the scoring with a 2-yard touchdown run to give Troy an early 7–0 lead. Less than a minute later, Haugabook hooked up with Gary Banks for a 3-yard touchdown pass to give Troy a 14–0 lead. With 5:12 left in the 1st quarter, Rice got on the board with an 11-yard touchdown pass from quarterback Joel Armstrong to wide receiver Mike Falco, making the score 14–7, Troy.

With just 2 seconds left in the 1st quarter, Haugabook connected with wide receiver Mikeal Terry for a 56-yard touchdown pass, and a 21–7 lead. Clark Fangmeier connected on a 43-yard field goal to cut the lead to 21–10. Omar Haugabook later found Andrew Davis for a 7-yard touchdown pass to give Troy a 28–10 lead.

Late in the third quarter, Greg Whibbs hit a 25-yard field goal to increase the lead to 31–10. He connected on a 26-yard field goal in the fourth quarter to increase the lead to 34–10. Wide receiver Jarett Dillard caught a 1-yard touchdown pass from Joel Armstrong to bring Rice to within 34–17. With two minutes left in the game, Haugabook connected with Toris Rutledge for a 5-yard touchdown pass to close the scoring, 41–17.

References

External links
 USA Today game summary

New Orleans Bowl
New Orleans Bowl
Rice Owls football bowl games
Troy Trojans football bowl games
New Orleans Bowl